The Morane-Saulnier B was an early French single-seat training and sports monoplane.

Design and development
The Morane-Saulnier B was a mid-wing monoplane that was made of wood.

Specifications

References

Further reading

1910s French sport aircraft
Single-engined tractor aircraft
Aircraft first flown in 1911
Mid-wing aircraft